Rossella Como (29 January 1939 – 20 December 1986) was an Italian actress and television personality.

Life and career 
Born in Rome, Rossella Como started her career at just 16 years old as a TV presenter, in the RAI show Primo applauso. Shortly later she made her film debut in a little but critically appreciated role in the Dino Risi's comedy film Poveri ma belli.

From then Como appeared with some frequency both as an actress and as a presenter in films and on television, as well as on stage.  In 1973 she was author and main actress of Roma Amor, a successful stage musical where she alternated Roman folk songs to sonnets of Pier Paolo Pasolini and Trilussa and with which she long toured in Italy and Latin America.

Rossella Como died of cancer.

Partial filmography 

 Roland the Mighty (1956) - Dolores
 Poor, But Handsome (1957) - Jole
 Oh! Sabella (1957) - Evelina Mancuso
 Seven Hills of Rome (1957) - Anita
 Lazzarella (1957) - Fanny
 Io, mammeta e tu (1958) - Carmelina, la figlia
 Legs of Gold (1958) - Carla Fontana
  Elena (uncredited)
 L'amore nasce a Roma (1958) - Doretta
 Carmela è una bambola (1958) - Doretta
 Caporale di giornata (1958) - Margherita
 Marinai, donne e guai (1958) - Juanita, la fotografa
 Perfide.... ma belle (1959) - Angela Antonia Garofalo
 The Loves of Hercules (1960) - Aleia
 Pesci d'oro e bikini d'argento (1961)
 Cacciatori di dote (1961) - Nella, Chambermaid
 Che femmina!! E... che dollari! (1961)
 Nerone '71 (1962)
 Il sangue e la sfida (1962)
 2 samurai per 100 geishe (1962)
 8½ (1963) - Un'amica di Luisa
 Toto vs. the Four (1963) - Moglie di Lancetti
 The Magnificent Adventurer (1963) - Angela 
 La pupa (1963)
 Scanzonatissimo (1963)
 The Shortest Day (1963) - Infermiera (uncredited)
 I due toreri (1964) - Dolores
 Canzoni, bulli e pupe (1964)
 Seven Vengeful Women (1966) - Katy Grimaldi
 The Million Dollar Countdown (1967) - Claudine
 I Married You for Fun (1967) - Ginestra
 How to Kill 400 Duponts (1967) - Barbara Le Duc, la moglie
 Ragan (1968) - Maria
 Franco, Ciccio e le vedove allegre (1968) - Mara
 It's Your Move (1968) - Mme Guinet
 Il sole è di tutti (1968) - Gianna
 I giardini del diavolo (1971) - Liesel
 Trastevere (1971) - Teresa
 Il sergente Klems (1971) - Miss Schinn, the Reporter
 The Best (1976) - Signora Chiocchietti
 Vacanze di Natale (1983) - Signora Covelli
 Christmas Present'' (1986) - (uncredited) (final film role)

References

External links 

Actresses from Rome
Italian stage actresses
Italian film actresses
Italian television actresses
1939 births
1986 deaths
20th-century Italian actresses
Italian television presenters
Deaths from cancer in Lazio
Italian women television presenters